The Fountainhead School, Surat, India, is an independent, co-educational day school, affiliated to the International Baccalaureate which imparts education from pre-kindergarten through Grade 12. Fountainhead Preschool was commenced by IIT Mumbai and IIM Ahmedabad graduates, Mr. Vardan Kabra and Mrs. Ankita Diwekar Kabra. Later, they collaborated with Mr. Parag Shah for a bigger campus in Kunkuni village. The present strength of the school is around 2000 students.

Academic curriculum 

The mode for instructions is English.

The school's curriculum is segregated into four main curriculum programs.

Facilities 

Footnotes

External links
Official website

Schools in Gujarat
Educational institutions established in 2008
2008 establishments in Gujarat
Education in Surat
Cambridge schools in India
International Baccalaureate schools in India